Lucy Douglas "C. Z." Guest (née Cochrane; February 19, 1920 – November 8, 2003) was an American stage actress, author, columnist, horsewoman, fashion designer, and socialite who achieved a degree of fame as a fashion icon. She was frequently seen wearing elegant designs by designers like Mainbocher. Her unfussy, clean-cut style was seen as typically American, and she was named to the International Best Dressed List Hall of Fame in 1959.

Life and career
She was born on February 19, 1920, in Boston, Massachusetts, to Vivian Wessell and Alexander Lynde Cochrane, an investment banker who belonged to a family of Boston Brahmins. Her brother called her "Sissy" and she transformed that into "C. Z." She dabbled in acting, including an appearance in the Ziegfeld Follies in 1944. She had two sisters, Nancy (née Cochrane) Palmer of Johns Island, Florida, and Jean ("Neenie") (née Cochrane) Cameron Welch of Knockbrack Grange, near Oldcastle in Co Meath, Ireland.

On March 8, 1947, she married Winston Frederick Churchill Guest, the son of Frederick Guest, who was a son of Ivor Bertie Guest, 1st Baron Wimborne, and Lady Cornelia Henrietta Maria Spencer-Churchill (daughter of John Spencer-Churchill, 7th Duke of Marlborough) and who, through his mother, was a first cousin of Sir Winston Churchill, and was a national polo champion. Ernest Hemingway was best man at the wedding, which took place at Hemingway's home in Havana, Cuba. The couple had two children, Alexander Guest and Cornelia Guest. C. Z. Guest was pictured on the cover of the July 20, 1962, issue of Time magazine as part of an article on American society.

After a horse riding accident in 1976, Guest was asked by the New York Post to write a column on gardening. Her first book, First Garden, was illustrated by her friend Cecil Beaton. Other friends included Truman Capote, Sawai Man Singh II of Jaipur, Barbara Hutton, Diana Vreeland, Babe Paley and William S. Paley, Gloria Guinness and Thomas "Loel" Guinness, and the Duke and Duchess of Windsor, who were the godparents of their children.

Much photographed, she was also painted by Diego Rivera, Salvador Dalí, Kenneth Paul Block, and Andy Warhol.

In 1985, she designed a small fashion collection consisting mainly of cashmere sweaters that was introduced at a show of the Cuban-born American designer Adolfo, well known for dressing Nancy Reagan and Babe Paley, among others. In 1986, she expanded her design work to include a limited line of sportswear sold under license, and, in 1990, she came out with a fragrant insect repellent and other garden merchandise.

Death
Guest died on November 8, 2003, in Old Westbury, New York, at the age of 83. A friend was driving her to the hospital after she experienced breathing difficulties at home.

References

External links
 C.Z. Guest: Beauty Icon on style.com
 Voguepedia - C.Z. Guest
 11/10/03 C. Z. Guest profile at the NewYorkSocialDiary.com
 Photos of C. Z. Guest at her Palm Beach mansion , 
 Photos and information on the Winston and C. Z. Guest estate on Long Island, New York

1920 births
2003 deaths
American columnists
American garden writers
American socialites
Actresses from Boston
Phipps family
C.Z.
Massachusetts Republicans
New York (state) Republicans
American women columnists